Dennis Dewane was a member of the Wisconsin State Assembly from the 3rd District of Brown County, Wisconsin during the 1873 and 1876 sessions. He was a Democrat. Dewane was born on November 14, 1834 in County Tipperary, Ireland.

Dewane also served as the first chairman of the town of New Denmark, Wisconsin after its formation in 1855.

References

19th-century Irish people
Politicians from County Tipperary
Irish emigrants to the United States (before 1923)
People from New Denmark, Wisconsin
1834 births
Year of death missing
Democratic Party members of the Wisconsin State Assembly